The creamy-crested spinetail, sometimes called the creamy-chested spinetail (Cranioleuca albicapilla) is a species of bird in the family Furnariidae. It is endemic to Peru.
Its natural habitats are subtropical or tropical moist montane forests and subtropical or tropical high-altitude shrubland.

References

creamy-crested spinetail
Birds of the Peruvian Andes
Endemic birds of Peru
creamy-crested spinetail
Taxonomy articles created by Polbot